David Manuki Vardanyan (12 February 1950 – 27 May 2022) was an Armenian politician. A member of the National Democratic Union, he was a member of the Supreme Council of Armenia from 1990 to 1995 and of the National Assembly of Armenia from 1995 to 1999. 

Vardanyan died on 27 May 2022, at the age of 72.

References

1950 births
2022 deaths
National Democratic Union (Armenia) politicians
Members of the National Assembly (Armenia)
Yerevan State University alumni
Politicians from Yerevan
20th-century Armenian politicians